Escape from Zahrain is a 1962 American Panavision adventure film directed by Ronald Neame and starring Yul Brynner. The film is based on the novel Appointment in Zahrain by Michael Barrett (1960).

Plot
The film is set in the fictional state of Zahrain, located in the Arabian Peninsula. An officer in the security service of a despotic regime arranges to murder a jailed revolutionary leader (Brynner) while he is being transferred between prisons. The leader's supporters stage a rescue, intending to subsequently flee across the desert to the Protectorate of Aden.

In the chaos of the rescue two condemned prisoners, a common criminal with no interest in politics (Caruso) and an American oil worker (Warden), join the leader and the mastermind of the breakout (Mineo) in getting away. Later they encounter an educated nurse (Rhue) who they are compelled to take along, and a jaded British intelligence agent (James Mason) who they are confident will not reveal their whereabouts. Together they provide different perspectives on the Middle East of the early 1960s.

Cast
 Yul Brynner as Sharif
 Sal Mineo as Ahmed
 Jack Warden as Huston
 Madlyn Rhue as Laila
 Anthony Caruso as Tahar
 Leonard Strong as Ambulance Driver
 Jay Novello as Hassan

Production
The film was based on the novel Appointment in Zahrain which was published in 1960. Paramount bought the novel prior to publication and gave the job to adapting the script to Dudley Nichols.

In October 1960 Paramount's then-chairman Jack Karp announced Richard Matheson was doing a script and Edward Dmytryk was going to direct the film.

By May 1961 Yul Brynner was attached as star, with Ronald Neame to produce and direct and Sal Mineo to co star. Robin Estridge wrote the script.

Filming began June 1961.

References

External links

1962 films
1960s action adventure films
Films directed by Ronald Neame
Films set in Asia
Films set in a fictional country
Films set in the Arabian Peninsula
Films produced by Ronald Neame
Films scored by Lyn Murray
Films with screenplays by Dudley Nichols
Films set in deserts
Films based on Australian novels
American action adventure films
1960s English-language films
1960s American films